Zographus oculator, the Orange-eyed Long-horn Beetle, is a species of flat-faced longhorn beetles belonging to the family Cerambycidae.

Description
The basic colour is black, with a transverse median band and large yellow orange-centred pair of eye-like spots (hence the Latin name oculator, from the Latin word oculus, meaning eye) located at the base, towards the tips and at the sides of elytra. These beetles show narrow yellow lines across the head and the thorax, two large rounded tubercles at the sides of the thorax and tiny wrinkles  on the elytra.

Distribution
This species can be found in Namibia and South Africa.

References
 Biolib
  Worldwide Cerambycoidea Photo Gallery
 Archive.org
 Vincent ALLARD   THE BEETLES OF THE WORLD

Sternotomini
Beetles described in 1775
Taxa named by Johan Christian Fabricius